Gérard Ugolini (born 9 February 1949) is a French athlete. He competed in the men's long jump at the 1968 Summer Olympics.

References

1949 births
Living people
Athletes (track and field) at the 1968 Summer Olympics
French male long jumpers
Olympic athletes of France
Place of birth missing (living people)